The 1954–55 Michigan Wolverines men's ice hockey team represented the University of Michigan in college ice hockey. In its 11th year under head coach Vic Heyliger, the team compiled an 18–5–1 record, outscored opponents 107 to 70, and won the 1955 NCAA men's ice hockey tournament. The 1955 championship was Michigan's fifth NCAA hockey championship in eight years.

During the regular season, the Wolverines finished in second place in the Western Intercollegiate Hockey League (WIHL) with a 13-5-0 record against conference opponents.

Team captain Bill MacFarland was the leading scorer with 56 points on 33 goals and 23 assists. For the second time in program history, six Michigan players were selected as first-team All-Americans. The All-American selections were defensemen Mike Buchanan and Bob Schiller, goalie Lorne Howes, and forwards MacFarland, Dick Dunnigan, and Tom Rendall. Howes, MacFarland, and Rendall were also named to the NCAA Frozen Four All Tournament First Team.

Season
Michigan was coming off of their seventh consecutive trip to the NCAA tournament but after losing what the team deemed to be inferior opponent the Wolverines saw their championship run end in the semifinal. Head Coach Had the Maize and Blue raring to go against McGill for their home opener, winning 7–2 but the team appeared to slip a bit after that. They finished their non-conference schedule 3–0–1 but when they headed to Colorado to face the Tigers and the Pioneers they came home with only 1 win in four games. After taking both games against hated rival Michigan State in a home-and-home series they split two consecutive weeks against Minnesota and Michigan Tech.

With more than half of their season over the Wolverines were at risk of missing the tournament for the first time with only a middling 5–5 record in the WIHL. Beginning with their second series against the Spartans in mid-February Michigan began showing the mettle that earned them four national titles in six years. The defense buckled down while the Wolverine attack seemed to score at will, winning eight straight games while averaging almost six goals per game. The winning streak allowed Michigan to separate themselves away from the rest of their competition and join Colorado College comfortably at the top of the conference. With a second place finish in the WIHL Michigan received the #2 western seed and they headed back to Colorado Springs.

The Wolverines began the 1955 championship against Harvard who were led by the nation's leading scorer in Bill Cleary (who averaged more than 4 points per game by himself). The Crimson offense was stymied by the Wolverines who continued to rack up the goals and take the semifinal 7–3. Two days later the Wolverines were again facing Colorado College in what amounted to a road game though this time the winner would skate away with the national championship.

Tom Rendall opened the scoring less than three minutes into the game and after exchanging the lead the Wolverines ended the first up 2-1. The CC offense started to ratchet itself up in the second, outshooting Michigan 15–6 but the second frame ended with the same score as the first. The Tigers increased their pace even more in the third but it was Michigan's Jay Gould who found the net first, increasing the Wolverine lead to 3–1. Colorado College did close the gap back to a single goal but less than a minute later Michigan restored their two-goal advantage. Clare Smith got the Tigers back within one less than three minutes left but Lorne Howes refused to allow any more recording his 47th save of the night before captain Bill MacFarland salted the game away with an empty-net marker at 19:57. Despite the herculean effort by the Wolverines it was Phil Hilton of the opposition who received the Tournament Most Outstanding Player though Howes, MacFarland and Rendall were all named to the All-Tournament First Team.

Standings

Schedule

|-
!colspan=12 style=";" | Regular Season

|-
!colspan=12 style=";" |

Roster and scoring statistics

1955 national championship

Colorado College vs. Michigan

See also
1955 NCAA men's ice hockey tournament
List of NCAA Division I men's ice hockey champions

References

Michigan Wolverines men's ice hockey seasons
Michigan
Michigan
Michigan
Michigan